Zavodska is a station on Dnipro Metro's Tsentralno–Zavodska Line. It is a single-vault deep subway station, accessible only by an escalator and was opened on 29 December 1995 along with the rest of the system's first stations. The station is located on the Mayakovskoho Street. The station is named Zavodska, for the numerous factories and plants located alongside.

External links

 Dnipro Metropoliten - Zavodska Station

Dnipro Metro stations
Railway stations opened in 1995